The Wallace Collection is a museum in London occupying Hertford House in Manchester Square, the former townhouse of the Seymour family, Marquesses of Hertford. It is named after Sir Richard Wallace, who built the extensive collection, along with the Marquesses of Hertford, in the 18th and 19th centuries. The collection features fine and decorative arts from the 15th to the 19th centuries with important holdings of French 18th-century paintings, furniture, arms and armour, porcelain and Old Master paintings arranged into 25 galleries. It is open to the public and entry is free.

It was established in 1897 from the private collection mainly created by Richard Seymour-Conway, 4th Marquess of Hertford (1800–1870), who left both it and the house to his illegitimate son Sir Richard Wallace (1818–1890), whose widow Julie Amelie Charlotte Castelnau bequeathed the entire collection to the nation.  The collection opened to permanent public view in 1900 in Hertford House, and remains there to this day. A condition of the bequest was that no object should ever leave the collection, even for loan exhibitions. However in September 2019, the board of trustees announced that they had obtained an order from the Charity Commission for England & Wales which allowed them to enter into temporary loan agreements for the first time.

The United Kingdom is particularly rich in the works of the ancien régime, purchased by wealthy families during the revolutionary sales, held in France after the end of the French Revolution.  The Wallace Collection, Waddesdon Manor and the Royal Collection, all three located in the United Kingdom, are some of the largest, most important collections of French 18th-century decorative arts in the world, rivalled only by the Musée du Louvre, Château de Versailles and Mobilier National in France. The Wallace Collection is a non-departmental public body and the current director is Xavier Bray.

History

The Wallace Collection is a museum which displays works of art collected in the 18th and 19th centuries by five generations of a British aristocratic family – the first four Marquesses of Hertford and Sir Richard Wallace, the illegitimate son of the 4th Marquess.  In the 19th century, the Marquesses of Hertford were one of the wealthiest families in Europe. They owned large properties in England, Wales and Ireland, and increased their wealth through successful marriages.  Politically of lesser importance, the 3rd and 4th Marquess and Sir Richard Wallace became leading art collectors of their time.

The Wallace Collection, comprising about 5,500 works of art, was bequeathed to the British nation by Lady Wallace in 1897.  The state then decided to buy Hertford House to display the collection and it was opened as a museum in 1900. As a museum the Wallace Collection's main strength is 18th-century French art: paintings, furniture, porcelain, sculpture and gold snuffboxes and 16th- to 19th-century paintings by such as Titian, Van Dyck, Rembrandt, Hals, Velázquez, Gainsborough and Delacroix, a collection of arms and armour and medieval and Renaissance objects including Limoges enamels, maiolica, glass and bronzes.  Paintings, furniture and porcelain are displayed together in the manner of private collections of the 19th century.

Building

Hertford House, Cannon Row
The 16th- and 17th-century Hertford House was the London townhouse  of Edward Seymour, 1st Earl of Hertford (1539–1621) and was in a different location: Cannon Row in Westminster. His father Edward Seymour, 1st Duke of Somerset (executed 1552), brother of Queen Jane Seymour, had started building the palatial Somerset House on the Strand as his townhouse, but did not live to see its completion.

Hertford House, Manchester Square

The present House in Manchester Square was the townhouse of a later junior branch of the family. It was built in 1776 by George Montagu, 4th Duke of Manchester who owned and developed the surrounding estate. It dominates the north side of the Square, where it occupies an island site, and was originally named "Manchester House". After being used as the Spanish Embassy 1791–1795 (evidenced by "Spanish Place" the street to the east of the building) the lease was acquired in 1797 by Francis Ingram-Seymour-Conway, 2nd Marquess of Hertford (1743–1822), who in 1814 held there the Allied Sovereigns' Ball after the first defeat of Napoleon in 1814. Francis Seymour-Conway, 3rd Marquess of Hertford (1777–1842), the family's first great art collector, lived mainly at his other London residences, Dorchester House in Mayfair and St Dunstan’s Villa in Regents Park, now the site of the residence of the US Ambassador. Between 1836-51 Hertford House was let for use as the French Embassy. His son Richard Seymour-Conway, 4th Marquess of Hertford (1800–1870), who expanded his father's art collection, lived most of his life in Paris, and rarely visited Hertford House, used "largely as a store for his ever-expanding art collection". He is said never to have visited his principal English country seat of Ragley Hall in Warwickshire. The 4th Marquess died in 1870, aged 70 in Paris, unmarried and without legitimate issue, and his titles and entailed estates, including the lease of Hertford House, passed to his distant cousin Francis Seymour, 5th Marquess of Hertford (1812–1884). However the 4th Marquess's illegitimate son and heir of his unentailed estate, Sir Richard Wallace, 1st Baronet (1818–1890), inherited his art collection, French and Irish estates, and re-purchased Sudbourne Hall in Suffolk and in 1871 the lease of Hertford House from the 5th Marquess, and returned from Paris with much of the art collection to take up residence in England, following the unstable political climate in France following the Prussian Siege of Paris (1870–1871). Wallace in turn expanded the art collection, adding medieval and Renaissance objects and European arms and armour. Between 1872–1882 the house was much altered by Sir Richard Wallace, who added a rear extension to house his art collection with a smoking room lined with Minton tiles in Turkish style. Under the architect Thomas Ambler a new front portico was added in the form of a porte-cochère, with large Doric pilasters, storeys were added to both wings and the stables and coach house were converted to galleries by the addition of top-lit roofs. The whole building was given a red brick facade and the windows were altered. Wallace bequeathed all his assets to his wife, who in turn and most probably according to his wishes, bequeathed the main part of her husband's art collection to the nation, thus forming the "Wallace Collection", the rest, including the French properties and Hertford House, going to the couple's secretary Sir John Murray Scott, 1st Baronet. Scott sold the lease of Hertford House to the UK Government, as a suitable home for the Wallace Collection, after which he was rewarded with a baronetcy, and the Government acquired the freehold from the Portman Estate. Hertford House first opened as a museum on 22 June 1900. In 2000, the inner courtyard was given a glass roof and a restaurant was opened named "Cafe Bagatelle" after the Château de Bagatelle in Paris purchased in 1835 by Francis Seymour-Conway, 3rd Marquess of Hertford, later part of Scott's inheritance. The museum display does not aim to reconstruct the state of the house when Sir Richard and Lady Wallace lived here.

Interior

Ground Floor

Hall

The Entrance Hall contains marble busts of the three principal founders of the Wallace Collection: Richard Seymour-Conway, 4th Marquess of Hertford (1800–1870), his son, Sir Richard Wallace (1818–1890) and in the lobby, Lady Wallace, who bequeathed the contents of Hertford House to the British nation on her death in 1897. The room has retained the aspect it had in Sir Richard Wallace's day more than any other room in the building.

Front State Room
This room reveals the opulence of the London town house in the 1870s and sets the scene for visitors to the Wallace Collection. The State Rooms were the grandest rooms in the house, in which the most important visitors were received. When it was the home of Sir Richard and Lady Wallace, visitors to Hertford House first entered the Front State Room, then, as now, hung with portraits. Some of the modern furniture seen in the room in 1890 is no longer in the collection, but the mounted porcelain displayed on the cabinets and the chandelier, made by Jean-Jacques Caffiéri, have been returned to the room.

Back State Room
Displays: The Rococo at the time of Louis XV and Madame de Pompadour

The Back State Room is today dedicated to the patronage of King Louis XV (1715–1774) and his mistress, Madame de Pompadour. It displays some of the prominent examples in the Wallace Collection of art in the rococo style. Sir Richard Wallace used the Back State Room to entertain guests at Hertford House. During his lifetime it had wooden boiserie panelling on the wall; the great chandelier, by Jacques Caffiéri, dating from 1751, remains in the room.

Dining Room
Displays: Eighteenth-century still lifes and portraits

The room contains masterworks of French 18th-century portraiture by Nattier and Houdon and two oil sketches by Jean François de Troy, for decoration of Louis XV's dining room in Fontainebleau, shown to the king for approval.

Billiard Room
Displays: The Decorative Arts under Louis XIV

Breakfast Room
Displays: Visitor Reception and Cloakroom

This room was formerly Sir Richard and Lady Wallace's breakfast room.  As this photograph from c. 1890 shows, it contained a large cabinet filled with Sèvres porcelain dinner wares, probably more for use than decoration, and sixteen Dutch pictures.  The French chimneypiece in this room was made in the mid-18th century and installed in this room when the house was modified for Sir Richard and Lady Wallace.

Housekeeper's Room
Displays: Wallace Collection Shop

This room was occupied during Sir Richard and Lady Wallace's lifetime by the family's housekeeper.  Lady Wallace's housekeeper was Mrs Jane Buckley, a Londoner by birth.  There were over thirty servants, including housemaids, kitchen maids, a lady's maid, a butler, footmen, a valet, coachmen, a groom and stable lads.

Oriental Armoury
Displays: East European, Turkish and Indo-Persian Arms, Armour and Works of Arts

The Oriental arms and armour in the Wallace Collection were largely collected by the 4th Marquess of Hertford in the 1860s, the last decade of his life. Like many of his contemporaries, Sir Richard Wallace used this material to bring Oriental exoticism, as it was then considered, into his fashionable London house. The Oriental Armoury was displayed on the first floor of Hertford House. Trophies of arms and armour from India, the Middle East, the lands of the old Ottoman Empire, and the Far East, patterned the walls of the Oriental Armoury, whilst the ceiling was decorated with a pattern of gold stars on a deep blue background.

European Armoury IDisplays: Medieval and Renaissance Arms and Armour (tenth to sixteenth centuries)Sir Richard Wallace acquired most of his European armour in 1871, when he bought the collections of the comte Alfred Emilien de Nieuwekerke, Minister of Fine Arts to Napoleon III and director of the Louvre, as well as the finest parts of the collection of Sir Samuel Rush Meyrick, a pioneering collector and scholar of arms and armour. The arms and armour collections are today recognised as among the finest in the world. During Sir Richard Wallace's lifetime, this room formed part of the stables with the grooms' bedrooms on a mezzanine floor. Sir Richard's European arms and armour were displayed in one large gallery, today's West Gallery III, on the first floor, directly above European Armoury I.

European Armoury IIDisplays: Renaissance Arms and Armour (fifteenth to seventeenth centuries)The Wallace Collection contains some of the most spectacular Renaissance arms and armour in Britain. All of the richest and most powerful noblemen of the 15th, 16th and 17th centuries commissioned beautifully decorated weapons and armour, not just for war, but also for use in the awe-inspiring jousts, tournaments and festivals of the time. Fine arms and armour were considered works of art as much as warlike equipment.  Displayed in this gallery are some of the finest examples of the armourer's art, exquisite sculptures richly embellished with gold and silver. This space was formerly part of Sir Richard Wallace's stables.

European Armoury IIIDisplays: Later Arms and Armour (sixteenth to nineteenth centuries)The array of sporting guns, rifles and pistols in this room includes a large number of extravagantly decorated 16th- and early-17th-century wheel-lock firearms, together with an impressive group of magnificent civilian flint-lock guns of the Napoleonic era. Several of the weapons here were made for European rulers, including Louis XIII and Louis XIV of France and Tsar Nicholas I of Russia. It is a major collection of early firearms in the United Kingdom. This space was formerly part of Sir Richard Wallace's coach house and stable yard.

Sixteenth-Century GalleryDisplays: The Collector's CabinetThe Sixteenth-Century Gallery houses works of art from the Medieval and Renaissance periods and a group of important Renaissance paintings. This part of the Wallace Collection was mainly assembled by Sir Richard who, like many 19th-century collectors, was fascinated by the art and history of Europe during the Middle Ages and Renaissance. The Sixteenth-Century Gallery comprised two smaller rooms during Sir Richard and Lady Wallace's lifetime. The contemporary photograph shows how one room was arranged by Sir Richard as a cabinet of curiosities, with paintings and maiolica densely hung on the walls and smaller works of art kept in cases or inside Renaissance cabinets. The other room, known as the Canaletto Room, was used to display the collection of paintings by Canaletto.

Smoking RoomDisplays: Medieval and Renaissance Works of ArtThe Smoking Room exhibits paintings and works of art from the Medieval and Renaissance periods, including the greater part of Sir Richard Wallace's collection of Italian Renaissance maiolica. Sir Richard Wallace would have invited his male guests to the Smoking Room after dinner, to discuss affairs of the day over an enjoyable pipe or cigar. The room had oriental interiors, with walls lined with Turkish-style tiles made by the Minton factory in Stoke-on-Trent, the floor laid with a patterned mosaic. A small section of this interior survives in the alcove at the north end of the room. This was not only a highly fashionable look for a late Victorian smoking room but also practical, ensuring the smell of smoke did not linger in any fabric furnishings.

Upper Floor
Landing
The Landing serves as the main orientation point on the first floor.  It is hung with mythological and pastoral paintings by Boucher and is also perhaps the best place to admire the wrought iron work of the staircase balustrade, made in 1719 for the Royal bank in Paris. Hertford House was built in 1776–78 for the 4th Duke of Manchester. After a brief spell as the Spanish Embassy, it was bought by the 2nd Marquess of Hertford in 1797.  He added the conservatory, in place of a Venetian window on the Landing and two first-floor rooms on each wing.

Lower Ground Floor
Porphyry Court
The Porphyry Court was little more than a rather dismal back yard until 2000, when it was transformed by being doubled in size and provided with a dramatic pair of flights of stairs.

Collections
The Collection numbers nearly 5,500 objects, a range of fine and decorative arts from the 15th to the 19th centuries.  The collection is known for its 18th-century French paintings, Sèvres porcelain and French furniture but also displays other objects, such as arms and armour featuring both European and Oriental objects, as well as displays of gold boxes, miniatures, sculpture and medieval and Renaissance works of art such as maiolica, glass, bronzes and Limoges enamels.

The works of art in the Collection comprise:
Paintings, watercolours and drawings 775
Furniture 528
Ceramics 510
European and Oriental arms and armour 2,370
Sculpture 466
Miniatures 334
Medieval and Renaissance works of art 363
Goldsmiths' work 120

Departments

The Wallace Collection is split into six curatorial departments: Pictures and Miniatures; Ceramics and Glass; Sculpture and Works of Art; Arms and Armour; Sèvres porcelain; and Gold Boxes and Furniture.

Pictures and miniatures
The Wallace Collection's Old Master paintings are some of the most prominent in the world, and date from the 14th to the mid-19th centuries. The highlights include Dutch and Flemish paintings of the 17th century, 18th- and 19th-century French paintings, and works by English, Italian and Spanish artists. Strengths of the collection include 5 Rembrandts (and school), 9 Rubens's, 4 Van Dycks, 8 Canalettos, 9 Guardis, 19 François Bouchers, Fragonard, 9 Murillos, 9 Teniers, 2 Titians, Poussin, 3 Velázquezs and 8 Watteaus. The inventory of pictures, watercolours and drawings comprises all the major European schools.

Paintings, drawing and watercolours in the collection
 British, German, Spanish, and Italian – 151 paintings, 60 drawings
 French (19th century) – 134 paintings, 57 watercolours
 French (before 1815) – 144 paintings, 8 drawings and watercolours
 Dutch – 173 paintings, 2 drawings
 Flemish – 8 paintingsDutch School:Ferdinand Bol – 1 painting
Gerard ter Borch – 2 paintings
Aelbert Cuyp – 5 paintings
Gerrit Dou – 1 painting
Frans Hals – 1 painting
Bartholomeus van der Helst – 1 painting
Meyndert Hobbema – 5 paintings
Melchior d'Hondecoeter – 3 paintings
Pieter de Hooch – 2 paintings including A Boy Bringing Bread and A Woman Peeling ApplesGabriel Metsu – 5 paintings

Adriaen van Ostade – 2 paintings
Isack van Ostade – 2 paintings
Rembrandt – 5 paintings
Jacob Isaakszoon van Ruisdael – 4 paintings
Frans Snyders – 1 painting
Jan Steen – 5 paintings
Adriaen van de Velde – 2 paintings
Willem van de Velde the Younger – 8 paintings
Jan Weenix – 13 paintings
Philips Wouwerman – 6 paintingsEnglish SchoolThomas Gainsborough – 2 paintings
John Hoppner – 1 painting
Sir Edwin Landseer – 4 paintings
Thomas Lawrence – 5 paintings
Joshua Reynolds – 12 paintings
J. M. W. Turner – 4 paintingsFlemish SchoolHans Memling – 1 painting
Pieter Pourbus – 1 painting
Pourbus the Elder, Frans – 1 painting
Peter Paul Rubens – 9 paintings
David Teniers the Younger – 9 paintings
Anthony van Dyck – 4 paintingsFrench School:François Boucher – 17 paintings (one of the largest holdings of his works in the world)
Philippe de Champaigne – 4 paintings
Jean-Baptiste-Camille Corot – 1 painting
Eugène Delacroix – 2 paintings including The Execution of the Doge Marino FalieroHippolyte Delaroche – 12 paintings
Gaspard Dughet – 1 painting
Jean-Honoré Fragonard – 8 paintings including his masterpiece, Lady with a Swing
Théodore Géricault – 2 paintings
Jean-Baptiste Greuze – 19 paintings
Nicolas Lancret – 11 paintings

François Lemoyne – 2 paintings
Claude Lorrain – 1 painting
Jean-Marc Nattier – 3 paintings
Jean-Baptiste Oudry – 7 paintings
Jean-Baptiste Pater – 13 paintings
Nicolas Poussin – 1 painting
Jean-François de Troy – 2 paintings
Claude-Joseph Vernet – 2 paintings
Horace Vernet – 30 paintings
Jean-Antoine Watteau – 8 paintings (the 3rd largest holdings in the world)Italian SchoolFrancesco Albani – 1 painting
Canaletto, (Giovanni Antonio Canal) – 8 paintings
Giovanni Battista Cima da Conegliano – 2 paintings
Carlo Crivelli –  1 painting
(Domenichino) – 1 painting
Francesco Guardi – 9 paintings

Bernardino Luini – 4 paintings
Salvator Rosa – 1 painting (one of the finest Rosas in existence)
Andrea del Sarto – 1 painting
Titian (Tiziano Vecelli) – 2 paintings including one of the six Poise's commissioned on Philip II of Spain
Sassoferrato – 3 paintingsSpanish SchoolAlonso Cano – 1 painting
Bartolomé Esteban Murillo – 9 paintings (one of the largest holdings of his works in the world)
Diego Velázquez – 2 paintings including Lady with a Fan, one of the artist's greatest paintings

Ceramics

There are fine examples of porcelain on display, including Meissen porcelain, and one of the world's major collections of 18th-century Sèvres porcelain. It includes 137 vases, 80 tea wares, 67 useful wares, 3 biscuit figures and 130 plaques (mostly on furniture), and was acquired by the Marquesses of Hertford and Sir Richard Wallace between c. 1802–75.

Arms and armour
, Dr. Tobias Capwell is Curator of the Arms and Armour collection.

Furniture
The Wallace Collection holds one of the most important collections of French furniture in the UK, and ranks alongside the Musée du Louvre, the Royal Collection, Waddesdon Manor, the collections of the Duke of Buccleuch, the Getty Museum and the Metropolitan Museum of Art as one of the greatest and most celebrated in the world. Totalling more than five hundred pieces, the collection consists largely of 18th-century French furniture but also includes some significant pieces of 19th-century French furniture, as well as interesting Italian furniture and a few English and German pieces.  The collection ranges from cabinet furniture, much of which is veneered with brass and turtleshell marquetry (commonly known as "Boulle" marquetry) or with wood marquetry, to seat furniture, clocks and barometers, gilt-bronze items including mounted porcelain and hardstones, mantelpieces, mirrors, boxes and pedestals. One highlight of the collection is the major collection of furniture attributed to André-Charles Boulle (1642–1732), perhaps the best-known cabinet-maker ever to have lived.Joseph Baumhauer – 1 item:
Bas d'armoire, c. 1765–1770André-Charles Boulle – 22 items:
Armoire, c. 1695;
Armoire, c. 1700;
Armoire, c. 1700;
Armoire, c. 1715;
Bureau plat, c. 1700–1710;
Cabinet avec son pied, c. 1667;
Cartonnier et pendule, c. 1715;
Commode, c. 1710;
Paire de grande table, c. 1705;
Mantle clock, c. 1715;
Mantle clock, c. 1726;
Médaillier, c. 1710–1720;
Miroir de toilette, c. 1713, (delivered to the Duchesse de Berry);
Paire de coffre de toilette, c. 1700;
Paire de torchéres, c. 1700–1710;
Pendule et gaine, c. 1712–1720;
Pendule et gaine, c. 1720–1725;
Table à mettre dans un trumeau, c. 1705;Martin Carlin – 4 items:
Paire de Encoignures, c. 1772;
Secrétaire à abattant, c. 1775;
Table en secrétaire, c. 1783;Adrien Delorme – 2 items:
Paire de bibliothèque basseÉtienne Doirat – 1 item:
Commode, c. 1720;Étienne Levasseur – 5 items;
Grande Bibliothèque, c. 1775;
Paire de bibliothèque basse, c. 1775
Paire de meubles à hauteur de'appui, c. 1775Alexandre-Jean Oppenord – 3 items:
Bureau plat, 1710;
Commode, c. 1695;
Écritoire, c. 1710;Jean Henri Riesener – 10 items:
Commode, delivered to Marie-Antoinette's cabinet intérieur de la reine at Versailles, c. 1780;
Commode, delivered to Marie-Antoinette for Chateau de Marly, c. 1782;
Encoignure, delivered to Marie-Antoinette's cabinet intérieur at Versailles, c. 1783;
Secrétaire à abattant, delivered to Marie-Antoinette's cabinet intérieur at Versailles, c. 1783;
Secrétaire à abattant, delivered to Marie-Antoinette's Petit Triannon at Versailles, c. 1783;
Secrétaire à abattant, delivered to Marie-Antoinette's cabinet intérieur at Versailles, c. 1780;
Bureau à cylindre, delivered to the comte d'Orsay for the Hôtel d'Orsay, c. 1774;
Bureau à cylindre, c. 1785;
Secrétaire à abattant, c. 1780–1784;
Table de toilette, c. 1780–1784;Bernard I Van Risen Burgh – 1 item:
Bureau plat, c. 1719Nicolas Sageot – 2 items:
Commode, c.1700;
Commode, c.1710;Adam Weisweiler'' – 4 items:
Paire de meubles à hauteur de'appui, c. 1780
Paire de meubles à hauteur de'appui, c. 1785–1790

Transport connections

References

Further reading

External links

 
 Explore by Gallery

 
1900 establishments in England
Armour collections
Art collections in the United Kingdom
Art museums established in 1900
Biographical museums in London
Charities based in London
Former private collections in the United Kingdom
Houses in the City of Westminster
Museums in the City of Westminster
Museums sponsored by the Department for Digital, Culture, Media and Sport
Non-departmental public bodies of the United Kingdom government
Order of Arts and Letters of Spain recipients
Portman estate